The President pro tempore of the Senate of Virginia is a Virginia constitutional office whose role is to serve as the presiding officer of the Senate of Virginia in the absence of the Lieutenant Governor.  The office is established in Article IV, Section 7 of the Constitution of Virginia.  The current office holder is Louise Lucas.

List of presidents pro tempore

References

Virginia General Assembly